The Bolivian chinchilla rat (Abrocoma boliviensis) is a species of chinchilla rat in the family Abrocomidae. It is found only in Manuel María Caballero Province, Bolivia. Its natural habitat is the rocky areas of cloud forests in Bolivia's interior.

Habitat and ecology
The Bolivian chinchilla rat lives in the cloud forests of Bolivia, and may specialize in the rocky areas within the cloud forest. It is a herbivore, and lives in burrows. Young are born precocial after a relatively long gestation period.

Threats

Major threats to the Bolivian chinchilla rat include the clearing of its cloud forest habitat for cattle pasture and habitat fragmentation. It was historically trapped for its fur.

References

Abrocoma
Mammals of Bolivia
Mammals described in 1990
Taxonomy articles created by Polbot